Naguib Chakouri (born 10 August 1992) is a French professional footballer who currently plays as a defender for Ligue 2 side Istres. He made his professional debut in the 1–2 Coupe de la Ligue defeat to Clermont Foot on 7 August 2012.

External links

1992 births
Living people
French footballers
Association football defenders
FC Istres players